Pech Chenda  is a khum (commune) of Phnum Proek district in the Battambang province in north-western Cambodia.

Villages

References

Communes of Battambang province
Phnum Proek District